Karl Farkas (28 October 1893 – 16 May 1971) was an Austrian actor and cabaret performer.

Biography

In accordance with the wishes of his parents, he was to study law, but decided to follow the call of the stage. After attending the Academy of Music and Acting Arts in Vienna, he debuted in Olmütz as Tsarevich, in a play by Gabryela Zapolska.

After various stage appearances in Austria and Moravia, he returned to Vienna in 1921, where he was engaged by Egon Dorn, the director of the Kabarett Simpl. There he worked as a 'Blitzdichter' (nickname: the Tick), and performed together with Fritz Grünbaum in a Doppelconférence, a cabaret number created in Budapest and consisting of a dialogue between two actors, one of whom plays a clever and educated interlocutor while the other has the role of a blunderer.

He married Anny Hán in 1924. Under the Nazi regime in 1938, he was forced to become a refugee because of his Jewish descent, going first to Brno, then Paris and ending up in New York. There he performed for other exiles and wrote his book of poems Farkas entdeckt Amerika (Farkas discovers America). Moreover, he wrote the libretto to Kálmán's operetta Marinka.

In 1946, he returned to Vienna, and from 1950 on, he performed at the Simpl again, now as its director, a role in which he remained until his death.

From 1957 onward, he appeared on a regular basis in broadcasting and later on the Austrian TV channel, ORF. Very popular were his Balances, e.g. balance of the year, balance of the month, etc.

Farkas also is the main character in the Austrian revue comic book Der Bloede und der Gscheite (engl.: The Stupid and the Smart One), released in 2014, drawn by illustrator Reinhard Trinkler and based on the classic 'Doppelconférences' by Hugo Wiener.

Works (selection)

Libretti
Journal der Liebe. Revue written in 1926 together with Fritz Grünbaum to music by Egon Neumann.
Wien lacht wieder!. Revue written in 1926 together with Fritz Grünbaum to music by Ralph Benatzky.
Die Wunder-Bar.
Der Traumexpreß. Revue written in 1931 together with Fritz Grünbaum to music by Robert Katscher.
Hofloge. Musical comedy written in 1936, based on a story by J. M. Crawford, to music by Hans Lang.
Dixie. Ein Musikalischer Kriminalroman in 5 Kapiteln: Revue written in 1938 together with Adolf Schütz to music by Michael Krasznay-Krausz.
Marinka. Operetta written in 1945 together with George Marion Jr. to music by Emmerich Kálmán.

Books
 Also sprach Farkas. Heiteres von Karl Farkas. Halm & Goldmann, Vienna 1930, with drawings by Matouschek.
 Farkas entdeckt Amerika. Funny book of poems, Triton Publishing Company, New York 1942, with drawings by Hans Burger
 Zurück ins Morgen. Paramount Printing and Publishing Co., New York 1946, with drawings by Matouschek.

Selected filmography

Film adaptations
When the Soldiers, directed by Luise Fleck and Jacob Fleck (1931, based on a play by Karl Farkas)
By Candlelight, directed by James Whale (1933, based on the musical comedy Bei Kerzenlicht)
Wonder Bar, directed by Lloyd Bacon (1934, based on the musical comedy Die Wunder-Bar)
Land of Love, directed by Reinhold Schünzel (1937, based on the musical comedy Hofloge), uncredited
Wunder Bar, directed by Daniele D'Anza (1955, TV film, based on the musical comedy Die Wunder-Bar)
Bei Kerzenlicht, directed by Ferry Olsen (1968, TV film, based on the musical comedy Bei Kerzenlicht)
Bei Kerzenlicht, directed by Jochen Bauer (1981, TV film, based on the musical comedy Bei Kerzenlicht)

Screenwriter
Lumpenkavaliere (dir. Carl Boese, 1932)
Sehnsucht 202 (dir. Max Neufeld, 1932, German-language version)
 (dir. Max Neufeld and Fred Ellis, 1932, French-language version)
Adventures on the Lido (dir. Richard Oswald, 1933)
 (dir. Carl Heinz Wolff, 1934)
Leap into Bliss (dir. Fritz Schulz, 1934)
Roxy and the Wonderteam (dir. Johann von Vásáry, 1938)
Boogie-Woogie Dream (dir. Hanuš Burger, 1944, short)
Fregola (dir. , 1948)
 (dir. Max Neufeld and Hervé Bromberger, 1949, French-language version)
 (dir. Max Neufeld, 1949, German-language version)
Nothing But Coincidence (dir. E. W. Emo, 1949)
Theodore the Goalkeeper (dir. E. W. Emo, 1950)
Gruß und Kuß aus der Wachau (dir. Fritz Schulz, 1950)
Der Fünfminutenvater (dir. Johann Alexander Hübler-Kahla, 1951)
 Shame on You, Brigitte! (1952)
 (dir. Eduard von Borsody, 1953)
 (dir. Franz Antel, 1953)
 (dir. Eduard von Borsody, 1953)
The Sweetest Fruits (dir. Franz Antel, 1954)
 (dir. Theo Lingen, 1955)
… und wer küßt mich? (dir. Max Nosseck, 1956)
 (dir. Wolfgang Becker, 1956)
  (dir. Hans Wolff, 1956)
August der Halbstarke (dir. Hans Wolff, 1957)
 (dir. Carl Boese, 1957)
 The Schimeck Family (dir. Georg Jacoby, 1957)
 (dir. E. W. Emo, 1957)
 (dir. Hans Wolff, 1958)
Love, Girls and Soldiers (dir. Franz Antel, 1958)
 (dir. Franz Antel, 1961)
 (dir. Franz Antel, 1961)
Romy und Julius (dir. , 1963, TV film)

References

External links 
 
 
 

Austrian male stage actors
Austrian operetta librettists
Jewish cabaret performers
Kabarettists
Austrian Jews
Writers from Vienna
1893 births
1971 deaths
Weimar cabaret
Austrian male film actors
Austrian male television actors
Austrian television presenters
20th-century Austrian male actors
20th-century Austrian screenwriters
20th-century Austrian male writers